Assaad Hardan (born 31 July 1951 in Rachaya Al Foukhar) is a Lebanese politician and the leader of the Syrian Social Nationalist Party in Lebanon. He joined the Syrian Social Nationalist Party in 1968 and became leader of the Central Political Bureau in 2016.

Career
He was elected in 1992 a member of the Lebanese Parliament representing the Eastern Orthodox seat from the Marjeyoun-Hasbaya district on the Amal/Hizballah ticket and has been named repeatedly to the government: Minister of State without portfolio between 1990 and 1992 (government of Omar Karami and Rachid Solh), Minister of Labour between 1995 and 1998 and between 2003 and 2004, he was succeeded by Assem Qanso in 2004.

He eventually lost his seat after the 2022 Lebanese general election and was replaced by Elias Jrade, an ideologically communist member of a 13-member October 17 reformist bloc.

References

Syrian Social Nationalist Party in Lebanon politicians
Living people
1951 births
Eastern Orthodox Christians from Lebanon
Lebanese University alumni
Members of the Greek Orthodox Church of Antioch
Members of the Parliament of Lebanon
Labour ministers of Lebanon
Ministers without portfolio of Lebanon
People from Hasbaya District